The abbreviation Ber. may refer to:

Chemische Berichte, a German-language journal of chemistry
Berakhot (Talmud), a tractate of the Mishnah